Masada Anniversary Edition Volume 2: Voices in the Wilderness is the second album in a series of five releases celebrating the 10th anniversary of John Zorn's Masada songbook project. It features 24 compositions by Zorn, each performed by different ensembles.

Reception

The Allmusic site awarded the album 3½ stars. The Klezmer Shack stated "for the wonderous ways in which these compositions are re-discovered and re-explored by a host of ensembles around the world, this collection becomes essential... This tribute only hints at the influence that Zorn and his Masada music have had internationally... This set is a wonderful starting point to get a sense of the music, or to enjoy its diversity and diverse interpretation.

Track listing

 *misspelled as "Malkut" on album sleeve

Personnel

Disc one

Karaim
Basya Schecter – oud, vocals
Shanir Ezra Blumenkranz – bass
Daphna Mor – recorder, melodica
Ben Oir – guitar
Noah Heoffeld – cello
Meg Okura – violin
Daniel Freedman – percussion, vocal shouts

Kisofim
Ben Perowsky – drums
Uri Caine – piano
Drew Gress – bass

Meholalot
Jaroslaw Tyrala – violin
Jaroslaw Bester – accordion
Oleg Dyyak – accordion, clarinet, percussion
Wojciech Front – bass

Lakom
Bruce Ackley – soprano
Larry Ochs – tenor
Jon Raskin – baritone saxophone
Steve Adams – sopranino

Tekufah
Wayne Horvitz – Fender Rhodes
Timothy Young – guitar
Keith Lowe – bass
Andy Roth – drums

Paran
Glenn Dickson – clarinet
Gary Bohan – trumpet
Michael McLaughlin – piano
Brandon Seabrook – guitar
James Gray – tuba
Eric Rosenthal – drums

Khebar
Mark Kramer – all instruments, voice

Nevalah
Daniel Zamir – soprano
Kevin Zubek – drums

Abidan
Jewlia Eisenberg – voice
Wesley Anderson – percussion

Tirzah
Chris Speed – clarinet
Brad Shepik – tamboura, electric saz, guitar
Skuli Sverrisson – bass, baritone guitar drones
Jim Black – drums, percussion
Jamie Saft – organ, keyboards, bass, guitar, programming

Peliyot
Eyal Maoz – guitar
Avishai Cohen – trumpet

Shebuah
Steve Bernstein – cornet
Doug Wieselman – Eb clarinet
Marty Ehrlich – bass clarinet
Doug Wamble – vocals, guitar
Aaron Johnson – shakers

Disc two
Ziphim
John Medeski – keyboards
Billy Martin – percussion
Chris Wood – bass

Avodah
Jon Madof – guitar
Mathias Kunzli – drums, percussion
Shanir Ezra Blumenkranz – bass

Rokhev
Daniel Hoffman – violin
Moses Sedler – cello
Paul Hanson – bassoon
Kevin Mummey – cajon

Tannaim
Mark Orton – guitar, dobro, banjo, percussion
Carla Kihlstedt – violin, viola
Rob Burger – accordion, bass harmonica

Acharei Mot
Peter Apfelbaum – organ, tenor, percussion
Hiawatha Lockport – organ
Charles Burnham – violin
David Phelps – guitar
Patrice Blanchard – bass
Dafnis Prieto – drums

Malkhut*
Ikue Mori – laptop electronics
Sylvie Courvoisier – piano
Susie Ibarra – drums

Kochot
Mike Patton – all instruments, voice
William Winant – percussion

Jair
Ben Goldberg – clarinet
Devin Hoff – bass
Ches Smith – drums

Ne'eman
Dave Binney – alto
Steve Cardenas – guitar
Tony Scherr – guitar
Jesse Murphy – bass
Brian Mitchell – organ
Kenny Wollesen – drums

Tahah
Anthony Coleman – piano
Brad Jones – bass
Roberto Rodriguez – drums

Tiferet
Jenny Scheinman – violin
Nels Cline – guitar
Todd Sickafoose – bass
Scott Amendola – drums

Kedem
Jamie Saft – organ, keyboards, bass, guitar, programming
Vanessa Saft – vocals

 *misspelled as "Malkut" on album sleeve

References

2003 albums
Albums produced by John Zorn
Tzadik Records albums
Masada Anniversary albums